Ahepe ("Ahépé" in French) is a village (now canton) in the southeast of Togo. Ahepe literally means "the house of Ahe". Founded around 1732, it is located approximately 63 km from Lomé, the political capital of Togo. Ahepe is a part of the district of Yoto, at 12 km from Tabligbo the capital of this district. It is3 km near Zafi in the west, 6 km from Kouve to the north, and 9 km from Tchekpo in the southern. Tabligbo lies in the east.

Ahepe is a group of several autonomous districts (or villages) led each one by their own different chief of village: Apedome, Assiko, Kpowla, and Notse. The name "Notsé is the name of the ancestral Ewe kingdom, and the name of the present city of Notse from where, the Ewe people left in the center southern part of Togo before around 1700 CE and fill all the south of Togo and the Volta Region, in Ghana. Probably, the district of Notse (in Ahepe) is the first settlement founded by Ahé and his relatives when coming from the Kingdom of Notse.

The village of Ahepe is now officially a canton, and the chief of the District of Apedome, Chief Assignon,  plays the role of Canton chief over the other chiefs. Apedome is the largest district or the village of Ahepe with sub-districts like: Gapeme, Gnatchi, Kpalipe, Hekpoe, Soukape,Seva Agbleta. The village of Kpokli is a bit far from Apedome with around 2 kilometers, but is under Apedome chief authority. It is important to notice that the dynasty of Assignon is playing this leadership role over Ahepe since historical time. Probablely, since German's authorityship time. See Togoland. But in 2008,TOGBUI SOSSOU FREDERIC ASSIGNON III, in his time chief of Ahepe-Apedome was officially appointed chief of all the Canton of Ahepe

The main economic activity of Ahepe inhabitants is subsistence agriculture.

Ahepe is supplied in drinking water from Tabligbo, the Yoto District capital via the water tower of the village of Kouve, located at 6 kilometers from Ahepe in the north. The village is also connected to electricity. Mobile phone networks as well as land phone network, but these later are not yet distributed in the village like that.

Ahepe has at least three Catholic primary schools, eleven government primary schools, two government secondary schools, a walled playground, a market place, and a dispensary (that the new and big one is built just a few years ago). Ahepe is now equipped with a Poste Office with Money Transfer service handled by Western Uninion and other Credit Unions

References

Populated places in Maritime Region